The disturbance storm time (Dst, Kyoto Dst) index is a measure in the context of space weather. It gives information about the strength of the ring current around Earth caused by solar protons and electrons. 

The ring current around Earth produces a magnetic field that is directly opposite Earth's magnetic field, i.e. if the difference between solar electrons and protons gets higher, then Earth's magnetic field becomes weaker.

A negative Dst value means that Earth's magnetic field is weakened. This is particularly the case during solar storms.

See also

 K-index

References

External links
 The Dst index homepage provided by Kyoto University
 Dst at NOAA/NGDC
 Dst as part of SWENET Latest Alerts (on ESA's Space Weather Portal)

Planetary science
Radio frequency propagation
Electric and magnetic fields in matter
Solar System
Space weather
Electromagnetism